Evolution of a Filipino Family is a Filipino experimental film co-produced, edited, written and directed by Lav Diaz. At 643 minutes (10 hours and 43 minutes), it is among the longest films ever made. It earned Diaz international critical acclaim and is noted for introducing many of Diaz' cinematic trademarks. The film won Best Picture and Best Production Design at the Gawad Urian.

Plot 

Variety described the film: "Lav Diaz’s Evolution of a Filipino Family patiently and methodically observes the collapse and hopeful revival of a poor farming clan, meant to symbolize a nation’s history spanning 1971 to 1987," during and immediately after the authoritarian rule of Ferdinand Marcos.

Cast 
Elryan de Vera as Raynaldo
Angie Ferro as Puring
Pen Medina as Kadyo
Marife Necesito as Hilda
Ronnie Lazaro as Fernando
Lui Manansala as Marya
Banaue Miclat as Huling
Sigrid Andrea Bernardo as Ana
Joel Torre as the Mayor
Angel Aquino as Rica
Rey Ventura as Ka Harim
Dido dela Paz as Dakila
Roeder as Bendo
Lorelie Futol as Martina
Erwin Gonzales as Carlos
Mario Magallona as Danny
Gino Dormiendo as Lino Brocka

Accolades 
22nd Gawad Pasado
 Best Picture (Tied with The Call of the River)
 Best Screenplay
 Best Production Design
 Best Film of the Decade

See also 
List of longest films

References

External links 

2004 films
Films about Filipino families
Films directed by Lav Diaz